Carbonoherpeton is an extinct genus of embolomere which lived in the Pennsylvanian (late Carboniferous) of Nova Scotia, Canada.

References 

Embolomeres
Carboniferous amphibians of North America
Pennsylvanian amphibians of North America
Paleozoic life of Nova Scotia